Meet Me In St. Louis is a studio album of phonograph records by Judy Garland with Georgie Stoll's Orchestra, released by Decca Records in 1944 featuring songs presented in the Metro-Goldwyn-Mayer eponymous motion picture.

Reception
Released less than 10 days before Columbia and Victor Records formally ended the 1942-44 recording ban, the album peaked at number two on the April 7, 1945 Billboard Best-Selling Popular Record Albums chart. In their Record Possibilities column, the magazine praised "The Trolley Song":

... There's plenty of bounce and the platter is actually given movie treatment, with everything on wax but the kitchen sink... You have to play this three times to take in everything... Even if you have another version get this, too.

"The Trolley Song" was nominated for the Academy Award for Best Original Song at the 15th Academy Awards, but lost to "Swinging on a Star" by Bing Crosby from Paramount's Going My Way. Additionally, the album was the debut of "Have Yourself a Merry Little Christmas", now a perennial holiday standard.

Track listing
With all selections featuring Georgie Stoll's Orchestra and Chorus, these newly issued songs were featured on a 3-disc, 78 rpm album set, Decca A-380.

Disc 1: (23360)

Disc 2: (23361)

Disc 3: (23662)

References

1944 albums
Decca Records albums
Judy Garland albums